

Tournament 

Kisei (Go)
1998 in go